Foothill High School is a public secondary school located in the unincorporated community of North Tustin, California. It has a mailing address of Santa Ana, but it is a part of the Tustin Unified School District. It is the only school in the Tustin Unified School District to offer the International Baccalaureate program. It is a recipient of multiple California Distinguished School and National Blue Ribbon School awards.

History and culture
Its name is derived from its literal position at the base of Cowan Heights and Lemon Heights in North Tustin. The school's colors are black and gold, and its mascot is the Knight. FHS offers 16 Advanced Placement courses, five International Baccalaureate Higher Level, and eight International Baccalaureate Standard Level courses.

Notable alumni

 Brian Alexander, former United States men's national water polo team member and 2011 Pan American Games gold medalist
 Eva Angelina (2003), adult film actress
 Brad Boxberger, baseball player
 Mike Champion (1976–1978), baseball player with the San Diego Padres
 Jamal Duff (1990), football player, actor
Kimberly Duran (born 1989), muralist
 Doug Eisenman (born 1968), tennis player
 Bruce Furniss, 1976 Olympic gold medalist, swimming
 Steve Furniss, 1972 Olympic bronze medalist, swimming
 Kristen Moe, 1977 Miss America Teen 
 Jason Hairston (1990), businessman, professional football player
 Margo Harshman (2004), TV & film actress Even Stevens
 Brittany Hayes, 2008 Olympic silver medalist, water polo
 Chris Hoke (1994), professional football player
 Phil Hughes (2004), baseball player
 Norm Katnik (1999), NFL center for Minnesota Vikings
 Adam Koets (2002), professional football player
 Jillian Kraus (born 1986), water polo player
 J. W. Krumpholz (2006), Olympic silver medalist, water polo
 Richard Lambourne (1993), 2008 USA Olympic gold medalist, men's volleyball team
 Matthew Lillard (1988), actor, Scooby Doo, Scream
 Caitlin Lowe (2003), member of the USA National Softball Team
 Kristen Mann (2001), Indiana Fever WNBA
 Bobby Okereke (2014), NFL linebacker for Indianapolis Colts 
 Jeff Pickler, baseball player and coach
 Rod Strachan, Olympic gold medalist
 Alison Sweeney, actress, Days of Our Lives
 Victory Tischler-Blue (1977), singer, film producer, and member of the band The Runaways

Other
Former head football coach of the Kansas State Wildcats, Bill Snyder, coached at Foothill High School from 1969-1974, then went on to a coach at Austin College and Iowa before landing at Kansas State University.

References

External links 

 Foothill High School website

Educational institutions established in 1963
High schools in Orange County, California
International Baccalaureate schools in California
Public high schools in California
1963 establishments in California